Nisal Randika (born 30 July 1982) is a Sri Lankan cricketer. He made his first-class debut in the 2001–02 season and has played more than 100 matches. He made his Twenty20 debut on 17 August 2004, for Colombo Cricket Club in the 2004 SLC Twenty20 Tournament.

References

External links
 

1982 births
Living people
Sri Lankan cricketers
Colombo Cricket Club cricketers
Galle Cricket Club cricketers
Cricketers from Colombo